Sugar Mountain may refer to:

 Sugar Mountain (North Carolina), a mountain in North Carolina
 Sugar Mountain, North Carolina, the village in Avery County named after the mountain
 Sugar Mountain Farm, Vermont
 Sugar Mountain (album), by Jack River, 2018
 Sugar Mountain (film), a 2016 film
 "Sugar Mountain" (song), by Neil Young
 Sugar Mountain (2005 film), written and directed by Aaron Himelstein

See also
 
 List of mountains named Sugarloaf